United Nationalist Movement (ΕΝΕΚ) was a Greek far-right political party. The party was founded in 1979 by former members of the youth of National Alignment. It participated in the European election, 1984 and gained 0.09%. In the European election, 1989, the party gained 0.23% of the vote.
A few years later the party dissolved.

Defunct nationalist parties in Greece